Margaret Anne Jolly  (born 12 April 1949), born in Sydney, Australia is an historical anthropologist recognized as a world expert on gender in Oceania. She is professor in the College of Asia and the Pacific and Convenor of the Gender Institute at the Australian National University in Canberra. Jolly is also a Fellow of the Academy of the Social Sciences in Australia.

Career
From 2010 to 2015, Jolly held an Australian Research Council Laureate Fellowship, an award valued at $2.7M. She has written extensively on gender in the Pacific, on exploratory voyages and travel writing, missions and contemporary Christianity, maternity and sexuality, cinema and art.

Jolly has held a number of prestigious academic roles including Head of the Gender Relations Centre 1992-2009; Burns Distinguished Visiting Chair, History, University of Hawaii at Manoa (1998); Visiting Professor, University of California, Santa Cruz (2002); Visiting Professor, Centre National de Recherche Scientifique and École des Hautes Études en Sciences Sociales, France (2009). Her work is widely held in libraries.

Honours
Jolly was made a Member of the Order of Australia in the 2020 Australia Day Honours for "significant service to education, particularly to gender and Pacific studies."

Selected works 

Family and gender in the Pacific: Domestic contradictions and the colonial impact co-edited with Martha Macintyre
Women of the Place, Kastom, Colonialism and Gender in Vanuatu (1994)
 Sites of Desire, Economies of Pleasure: Sexualities in Asia and the Pacific, co-edited with Lenore Manderson (1997)
 Maternities and Modernities: Colonial and Postcolonial Experiences in Asia and the Pacific, co-edited with Kalpana Ram (1998)
 Borders of Being: Citizenship, Fertility and Sexuality in Asia and the Pacific, co-edited with Kalpana Ram (2001)
Birthing in the Pacific: Beyond Tradition and Modernity?, co-edited with Vicki Lukere (2001)
 Oceanic Encounters: Exchange, Desire, Violence, co-edited with Serge Tcherkézoff and Darrell Tryon (2009)
 Engendering Violence in Papua New Guinea co-edited with Christine Stewart and Carolyn Brewer (2012)
Gender Violence and Human Rights: Seeking Justice in Fiji, Papua New Guinea and Vanuatu co-edited with Aletta Biersack and Martha Macintyre

References

External links
 

1949 births
Living people
Australian anthropologists
Australian women anthropologists
Academic staff of the Australian National University
University of Hawaiʻi faculty
University of California, Santa Cruz faculty
Members of the Order of Australia
Australian women academics
Fellows of the Academy of the Social Sciences in Australia